Cecilia Lucco (born 16 April 1968) is a former Italian World Cup alpine ski racer

World Championships results

National titles
Lucco won two national titles.

Italian Alpine Ski Championships
Giant slalom: 1986, 1988

References

External links
 

1968 births
Living people
Italian female alpine skiers